Lie point symmetry is a concept in advanced mathematics. Towards the end of the nineteenth century, Sophus Lie introduced the notion of Lie group in order to study the solutions of ordinary differential equations (ODEs). He showed the following main property: the order of an ordinary differential equation can be reduced by one if it is invariant under one-parameter Lie group of point transformations. This observation unified and extended the available integration techniques. Lie devoted the remainder of his mathematical career to developing these continuous groups that have now an impact on many areas of mathematically based sciences. The applications of Lie groups to differential systems were mainly established by Lie and Emmy Noether, and then advocated by Élie Cartan.

Roughly speaking, a Lie point symmetry of a system is a local group of transformations that maps every solution of the system to another solution of the same system. In other words, it maps the solution set of the system to itself. Elementary examples of Lie groups are translations, rotations and scalings.

The Lie symmetry theory is a well-known subject. In it are discussed continuous symmetries opposed to, for example, discrete symmetries. The literature for this theory can be found, among other places, in these notes.

Overview

Types of symmetries 
Lie groups and hence their infinitesimal generators can be naturally "extended" to act on the space of independent variables, state variables (dependent variables) and derivatives of the state variables up to any finite order. There are many other kinds of symmetries. For example, contact transformations let coefficients of the transformations infinitesimal generator depend also on first derivatives of the coordinates. Lie-Bäcklund transformations let them involve derivatives up to an arbitrary order. The possibility of the existence of such symmetries was recognized by Noether.

Applications 
Lie symmetries were introduced by Lie in order to solve ordinary differential equations. Another application of symmetry methods is to reduce systems of differential equations, finding equivalent systems of differential equations of simpler form. This is called reduction. In the literature, one can find the classical reduction process, and the moving frame-based reduction process. Also symmetry groups can be used for classifying different symmetry classes of solutions.

Geometrical framework

Infinitesimal approach 
Lie's fundamental theorems underline that Lie groups can be characterized by elements known as infinitesimal generators. These mathematical objects form a Lie algebra of infinitesimal generators. Deduced "infinitesimal symmetry conditions" (defining equations of the symmetry group) can be explicitly solved in order to find the closed form of symmetry groups, and thus the associated infinitesimal generators.

An infinitesimal generator  in the field  is a linear operator  that has  in its kernel and that satisfies the Leibniz rule:
.
In the canonical basis of elementary derivations , it is written as:

Lie groups and Lie algebras of infinitesimal generators 

Lie algebras can be generated by a generating set of infinitesimal generators as defined above. To every Lie group, one can associate a Lie algebra. Roughly, a Lie algebra  is an algebra constituted by a vector space equipped with Lie bracket as additional operation. The base field of a Lie algebra depends on the concept of invariant. Here only finite-dimensional Lie algebras are considered.

Continuous dynamical systems 

A dynamical system (or flow) is a one-parameter group action. Let us denote by  such a dynamical system, more precisely, a (left-)action of a group  on a manifold :

such that for all point  in :

A continuous dynamical system is defined on a group  that can be identified to  i.e. the group elements are continuous.

Invariants 

An invariant, roughly speaking, is an element that does not change under a transformation.

Definition of Lie point symmetries 

In this paragraph, we consider precisely expanded Lie point symmetries i.e. we work in an expanded space meaning that the distinction between independent variable, state variables and parameters are avoided as much as possible.

A symmetry group of a system is a continuous dynamical system defined on a local Lie group  acting on a manifold . For the sake of clarity, we restrict ourselves to n-dimensional real manifolds  where  is the number of system coordinates.

Lie point symmetries of algebraic systems 

Let us define algebraic systems used in the forthcoming symmetry definition.

Algebraic systems 

Definition of Lie point symmetries 

The following theorem (see th. 2.8 in ch.2 of ) gives necessary and sufficient conditions so that a local Lie group  is a symmetry group of an algebraic system.

Theorem. Let  be a connected local Lie group of a continuous dynamical system acting in the n-dimensional space . Let  with  define a regular system of algebraic equations:

Then  is a symmetry group of this algebraic system if, and only if,

Example 
Consider the algebraic system defined on a space of 6 variables, namely  with:

The infinitesimal generator

is associated to one of the one-parameter symmetry groups. Thus the relations  are satisfied for any  in  that vanishes the algebraic system.

Lie point symmetries of dynamical systems 

Let us define systems of first-order ODEs used in the forthcoming symmetry definition.

Systems of ODEs and associated infinitesimal generators 

Let  be a derivation w.r.t. the continuous independent variable . With these notations, a system of first-order ODEs is a system where:

and the set  specifies the evolution of state variables of ODEs w.r.t. the independent variable. The elements of the set  are called state variables, these of  parameters.

One can associate also a continuous dynamical system to a system of ODEs by resolving its equations.

An infinitesimal generator is a derivation that is closely related to systems of ODEs (more precisely to continuous dynamical systems). For the link between a system of ODEs, the associated vector field and the infinitesimal generator, see section 1.3 of. The infinitesimal generator  associated to a system of ODEs, described as above, is defined with the same notations as follows:

Definition of Lie point symmetries 

Here is a geometrical definition of such symmetries. Let  be a continuous dynamical system and  its infinitesimal generator. Hence, the infinitesimal generator  satisfies the following relation based on Lie bracket:

These generators are linearly independent.

Example 

Consider Pierre François Verhulst's logistic growth model with linear predation, where the state variable  represents a population. The parameter  is the difference between the growth and predation rate and the parameter  corresponds to the receptive capacity of the environment:

The continuous dynamical system associated to this system of ODEs is:

The infinitesimal generator associated to this system of ODEs is:

The following infinitesimal generators belong to the 2-dimensional symmetry group of :

Software 

There exist many software packages in this area. For example, the package liesymm of Maple provides some Lie symmetry methods for PDEs. It manipulates integration of determining systems and also differential forms. Despite its success on small systems, its integration capabilities for solving determining systems automatically are limited by complexity issues. The DETools package uses the prolongation of vector fields for searching Lie symmetries of ODEs. Finding Lie symmetries for ODEs, in the general case, may be as complicated as solving the original system.

References 

Lie groups
Symmetry